Ganegama Grama Niladhari Division is a Grama Niladhari Division of the Panduwasnuwara West Divisional Secretariat  of Kurunegala District  of North Western Province, Sri Lanka .  It has Grama Niladhari Division Code 1328.

Ganegama is a surrounded by the Alahenegama, Beliwewa, Dothella, Mandapola, Rambewa and Madulla  Grama Niladhari Divisions.

Demographics

Ethnicity 

The Ganegama Grama Niladhari Division has a Sinhalese majority (99.9%) . In comparison, the Panduwasnuwara West Divisional Secretariat (which contains the Ganegama Grama Niladhari Division) has a Sinhalese majority (86.8%) and a significant Moor population (12.6%)

Religion 

The Ganegama Grama Niladhari Division has a Buddhist majority (97.8%) . In comparison, the Panduwasnuwara West Divisional Secretariat (which contains the Ganegama Grama Niladhari Division) has a Buddhist majority (83.6%) and a significant Muslim population (12.8%)

Grama Niladhari Divisions of Panduwasnuwara West Divisional Secretariat

References